The 2015–16 Princeton Tigers women's basketball team represented Princeton University during the 2015–16 NCAA Division I women's basketball season. The Tigers, led by ninth year head coach Courtney Banghart, played their home games at Jadwin Gymnasium as members of the Ivy League.

During the DoubleTree LA Thanksgiving Classic championship game on November 28, senior guard Michelle Miller became the 23rd Princeton women's basketball player to surpass the 1,000-point mark. In the February 7 game against Harvard, senior forward and team co-captain Alex Wheatley scored her 1,000th career point.

Princeton finished the regular season with a 23–5 overall record and 12–2 in the Ivy League. Their only two conference losses came against Pennsylvania, who won the season-ending championship game. The Tigers were an at-large selection to the NCAA tournament, notably becoming the first-ever Ivy League team to earn an at-large bid in either the men's or women's NCAA Tournament. However, they lost in the first round to West Virginia.

Previous season
The Tigers finished the 2014–15 season at 31–1, 14–0 to win the Ivy League regular season title to earn an automatic trip to the 2015 NCAA Division I women's basketball tournament, which they lost to Maryland in the second round. The Tigers' No. 13 ranking in both the Associated Press Top-25 and USA Today Coaches polls were the highest in conference history. Princeton's No. 8 seed was the best an Ivy program has ever earned, and the Tigers' first round win over Green Bay was just the second NCAA victory for an Ivy team, joining No. 16 Harvard's upset over No. 1 Stanford in 1998.

Roster

Schedule

|-
!colspan=8 style="background:#000000; color:#FF6F00;"| Regular season

|-
!colspan=8 style="background:#000000; color:#FF6F00;"| Ivy League regular season

|-
!colspan=12 style=""|NCAA Women's Tournament

Rankings

See also
2015–16 Princeton Tigers men's basketball team

References

External links
 Feature: On the Road to Columbus with WBB, Ivy League Digital Network feature of the team (video)

Princeton
Princeton
Princeton Tigers women's basketball seasons
Princeton Tigers women's
Princeton Tigers women's